Victor Schœlcher (F 725) was a  of French Navy. She was later transferred to National Navy of Uruguay in 1988 and given the name General Artigas. The ship was scrapped in 2005.

Development and design 

The main gun armament of the Commandant Rivière class consisted of three of the new French  guns, with a single turret located forward and two turrets aft. These water-cooled automatic dual-purpose guns could fire a  shell at an effective range of  against surface targets and  against aircraft at a rate of 60 rounds per minute. Two triple torpedo tubes were fitted for anti-submarine torpedoes, while the ship's armament was completed by two  Hotchkiss HS-30 cannon. The ship had accommodation for an 80-man commando detachment with two fast landing boats, each capable of landing 25 personnel.

Construction and career 
Victor Schœlcher was laid down in October 1957 and launched on 11 October 1958 at Arsenal de Lorient in Lorient. The vessel was commissioned on 4 December 1962.

Victor Schœlcher operated among other places with the Indian Navy and collaborated in the evacuation of the Diego Suarez base in the independence of Madagascar. She helped in Cyclone Andry in 1983 by rescuing refugees in the Pacific.

The frigate was sold to Uruguay in 1988 and given the new name General Artigas. The ship remained in service until 27 April 2005.

References

1958 ships
Commandant Rivière-class frigates
Frigates of the National Navy of Uruguay